Lynette Anne Jones is a New Zealand mechanical engineer whose research concerns haptic technology, haptic perception, thermal output devices, microsurgery, and the function and mechanics of the human hand and skin. She is a senior research scientist in the Department of Mechanical Engineering at the Massachusetts Institute of Technology, and editor-in-chief of the journal IEEE Transactions on Haptics.

Education and career
Jones earned bachelors and masters degrees at the University of Auckland in 1976 and 1978. She completed a PhD at McGill University in Canada in 1983.

After postdoctoral research at McGill's Montreal Neurological Institute, she continued at McGill as a researcher and, in 1991, became a tenured associate professor there. She moved to the Massachusetts Institute of Technology as a principal research scientist in 1994, and was named a senior research scientist in 2010.

She has been editor-in-chief of IEEE Transactions on Haptics since 2014.

Books
Jones is the author of the book Haptics (MIT Press, Essential Knowledge Series, 2018). With Susan Lederman, Jones is coauthor of the book Human Hand Function (Oxford University Press, 2006).

Recognition
Jones was named an IEEE Fellow in 2018, "for contributions to tactile and thermal displays".

References

External links
Home page

Year of birth missing (living people)
Living people
New Zealand mechanical engineers
New Zealand women engineers
University of Auckland alumni
McGill University alumni
Academic staff of McGill University
Fellow Members of the IEEE